Al-Janad Mosque is an ancient mosque located 20km southwest of Taiz, Yemen. It is considered the oldest surviving and the first mosque in Yemen built during the beginning of Islam, established by Muadh ibn Jabal who was sent by the Islamic prophet Muhammad to Yemen to teach its people and the provisions regarding the religion and spend among them in accordance with Sharia in the year 6 AH (628 CE). As such it is one of the most important religious sites in Taiz governorate. It is also known as Mu'adh Mosque.

History
Muadh ibn Jabal built the mosque after meeting with soldiers of the province in the first Friday of Rajab (seventh month of Islamic calendar). Since then people have been holding festival every day on the first Friday of Rajab, by heading to the mosque to pray and conduct other religious rituals. The mosque has been renovated and restored for countless of times throughout the history. Al-Husayn ibn Salama re-built the mosque during the period of 896 to 981. It is said that the local governor of Sulayhid dynasty also carried out construction work in the mosque. It was destroyed during the days of Mehdi bin Ali bin Mahdi al-Re'ai al-Humeiri in 1137, and then the Ayyubid ruler Saif al-Din Atabek restored the building in 1154, adding to the building the southern corridor, the side hallways and a sahn. Sultan al-Nasir Ayyub built its ceilings with plaster and carved with gold and lapis lazuli in 1206.

Architecture
The current mosque is rectangular shaped with 65.5 x 43 square meters wide. It is surrounded by a wall with 144 serrated balconies. Its general layout consists of an open sahn (35.5 x 25.5 m) with a square column height of about 2m. The qibla, which consists of four bays and adorns the qibla wall, has two mihrabs placed between them. It is considered an artistic masterpiece rich in ornamentation, carves and engraves. It is one of the remaining platforms, dating back to the time of Taghtikin ibn Ayyub in the last quarter of the 12th-century. The minaret occupies a part of the southwestern corner and consists of a cylindrical lower part topped by an octagonal shape above which a hexagon revolves and crowns the minaret from the top of the dome. Alongside the minaret there is a stone tablet written by the name of Sultan Amer ibn Abdul Wahab, in addition to other plates that recorded the successive renovations that took place on this mosque through the different historical periods.

The mosque is open to visit throughout the year.

See also
List of mosques in Yemen

References

Buildings and structures completed in 1275
7th-century mosques
Mosques in Yemen
Taiz